Ramoceros is an extinct genus of the artiodactyl family Antilocapridae endemic to Middle Miocene (Clarendonian) North America.

Taxonomy
Ramoceros is one of several genera that originated from the subfamily Merycodontinae, of which the pronghorn is the only surviving remnant. In fact, pronghorn is the only surviving remnant of the entire family Antilocapridae.

Merriamoceros was originally placed in Ramoceros (as Ramoceros coronatus).

Description
 
Ramoceros was a prehistoric relative of modern pronghorn (Antilocapra americana), which is a species of artiodactyl mammal indigenous to interior western and central North America; modern pronghorn are the second-fastest mammal in the world.

The horns of Ramoceros are notable in that one horn, either the left or right, is always about three to four times larger than the other.

Paleobiology
The long forked horns of Ramoceros may have been used by rival males in competition. Like other antilocaprids, Ramoceros regrew their horns every year, forming new horns growing on bony centers.

Bibliography
Vertebrate Palaeontology by Michael J. Benton
The Evolution of Artiodactyls by Donald R. Prothero and Scott E. Foss

References

Prehistoric pronghorns
Prehistoric even-toed ungulate genera
Miocene even-toed ungulates
Miocene mammals of North America
Clarendonian
Fossil taxa described in 1937